396th may refer to:

396th Bombardment Group, inactive United States Air Force unit
396th Bombardment Squadron, associate unit of the 15th Wing at Joint Base Pearl Harbor-Hickam, Hawaii
396th Fighter Squadron or 182d Fighter Squadron, unit of the Texas Air National Guard 149th Fighter Wing located at Kelly Field Annex
396th Infantry, infantry regiment of the United States Army National Guard that saw action in World War I and World War II

See also
396 (number)
396, the year 396 (CCCXCVI) of the Julian calendar
396 BC